The School District of Lee County manages public education in Lee County, Florida. As of the 2019–20 school year, there were 95,647 students attending 119 schools in the district, which had an operating budget of $1.327 billion.

The District school choice system is an open-enrollment system for school assignments and goes through the Student Assignment Office. A lottery process is used to assign students to schools when the number of applicants for a school exceeds the number of available seats. Students’ applications are assigned random numbers to determine the order in which their applications will be considered in the assignment process.

Integration
While Brown v. Board of Education outlawed segregated public schools in 1954, Lee County opted to ignore the ruling. In 1964, a student named Rosalind Blalock attempted to enroll in Fort Myers High School, but was denied admission to the whites-only school. A court case filed on her behalf by the NAACP resulted in a court order that forced Lee County to begin integrating the public schools. Prior to that time, Lee maintained a system that was separate but not equal for minority students. The district proceeded, first by integrating the teachers, then the elementary schools, and finally the high schools. In 1969, traditionally black Dunbar High School was closed, and students were reassigned to various white high schools around the county. The situation was often tense, with a riot breaking out at Fort Myers High School, and administrators at Fort Myers High School pretended not to recognize a black coach, causing police officers to send attack dogs after him. The court order stayed in place for 35 years, and many of its measures are still in place today.

Post-secondary
Fort Myers Technical College
Cape Coral Technical College

High schools 
 Bonita Springs High School
 Cape Coral High School
 Cypress Lake High School
 Dunbar High School
 East Lee County High School 
 Estero High School
 Florida Southwestern Collegiate High School
 Fort Myers Senior High School
 Gateway High School
 Gateway Charter High School
 Ida S. Baker High School
 Island Coast High School
 Lehigh Senior High School
 Mariner High School
 North Fort Myers High School
 Oasis High School
 Riverdale High School
 South Fort Myers High School
 Southwest Florida Christian Academy

Middle schools 
 Alva Middle School
 Bonita Springs Middle School
 Caloosa Middle School
 Challenger Middle School
 Cypress Lake Middle School
 Diplomat Middle School
 Fort Myers Middle Academy
 Gateway Charter School
 Gulf Middle School
 Harns Marsh Middle School
 Lee Middle School
 Lehigh Acres Middle School
 Lexington Middle School
 Mariner Middle School
 North Fort Myers Academy for the Arts K-8
 Oak Hammock Middle School
 Oasis Middle School
 Paul Laurence Dunbar Middle School
 Six Mile Charter Academy
 The Sanibel School K-8
 Three Oaks Middle School
 Trafalgar Middle School
 Varsity Lakes Middle School
 Veterans Park Academy for the Arts

Elementary schools 
 Allen Park Elementary
 Alva Elementary
 Bayshore Elementary
 Bonita Springs Elementary
 Caloosa Elementary
 Cape Elementary
 Colonial Elementary
 Diplomat Elementary
 Dr. Carrie D. Robinson Littleton Elementary
 Edgewood Academy
 Edison Park Creative and Expressive Arts School
 Fort Myers Beach Elementary
 Franklin Park Magnet
 G. Weaver Hipps Elementary School
 Gateway Charter School
 Gateway Elementary
 Gulf Elementary
 Hancock Creek Elementary
 Harns Marsh Elementary
 Hector A. Cafferata, Jr. Elementary
 Heights Elementary
 J. Colin English Elementary
 James Stephens International Academy
 Lehigh Elementary
 Manatee Elementary
 Mirror Lakes Elementary
 North Fort Myers Academy for the Arts K-8
 Oasis Elementary North
 Oasis Elementary South
 Orange River Elementary
 Orangewood Elementary
 Patriot Elementary
 Pelican Elementary
 Pine Island Elementary
 Pinewoods Elementary
 Ray V. Pottorf Elementary
 Rayma C. Page Elementary
 River Hall Elementary
 San Carlos Park Elementary
 Skyline Elementary
 Spring Creek Elementary 
 Sunshine Elementary
 Tanglewood/Riverside Elementary
 The Sanibel School K-8
 Three Oaks Elementary
 Tice Elementary
 Tortuga Preserve Elementary
 Trafalgar Elementary
 Treeline Elementary
 Tropic Isles Elementary
 Veterans Park Academy for the Arts K-8
 Villas Elementary

See also 

 List of school districts in Florida

References

External links 
 

Lee County
Education in Lee County, Florida